Compassion & Choices is a nonprofit organization in the United States working to improve patient autonomy and individual choice at the end of life, including access to medical aid in dying. Its primary function is advocating for and ensuring access to aid in dying

History
Compassion & Choices is the successor to the Hemlock Society, and Compassion In Dying Federation; the organizations merged in 2007. The organization has a staff of 80 people located across the country.

The 2011 Sundance Film Festival Grand Jury prize winner, How to Die in Oregon, documented the work of Compassion & Choices of Oregon.

See also
 Act 39 in Vermont, the first state to pass a death with dignity law by legislative action
Barbara Coombs Lee
Baxter v. Montana
California End of Life Option Act
Oregon Death with Dignity Act
Family Health Care Decisions Act
Gonzales v. Oregon
Brittany Maynard
Vacco v. Quill
Washington v. Glucksberg
Washington Death with Dignity Act

References

Bibliography

 
 
 
 
 
 
 
 Farewell to Hemlock: Killed by its name, an essay by Derek Humphry 21 February 2005

External links
 

Organizations established in 2005
Non-profit organizations based in Oregon
Health law in the United States
Assisted suicide
Euthanasia organizations